Khan Bahadur is a 1937 Hindi/Urdu social film produced and directed by Sohrab Modi.
The music director was B. S. Hoogan. The film was the acting debut of Prem Adib, who went on to act in mythological and social films becoming famous with Vijay Bhatt-directed films like Bharat Milap (1942) and Ram Rajya (1943). Other actors in the film were Sohrab Modi, Naseem Banu,  Sadiq Ali,  Eruch Tarapore, Ghulam Hussain and Saadat Ali.

Cast
 Sohrab Modi
 Naseem Banu
 Prem Adib
 Sadiq Ali
 Ghulam Hussain
 Eruch Tarapore
 Sheela
 Saadat Ali

Soundtrack
The music composer was B. S. Hoogan.

Song List

References

External links

1937 films
1930s Hindi-language films
1937 drama films
Indian drama films
Films directed by Sohrab Modi
Indian black-and-white films
Hindi-language drama films